Anne-Lise Bardet (born 18 November 1974, in Oyonnax) is a French slalom canoeist who competed in the 1990s and 2000s.

She won the bronze medal in the K1 event at the 2000 Summer Olympics in Sydney.

Bardet also won a gold medal in the K1 team event at the 2002 ICF Canoe Slalom World Championships in Bourg St.-Maurice and a bronze medal in the same event at the 2002 European Championships in Bratislava.

World Cup individual podiums

References

DatabaseOlympics.com profile
42-83 from Medal Winners ICF updated 2007.pdf?MenuID=Results/1107/0,Medal_winners_since_1936/1510/0 ICF medalists for Olympic and World Championships - Part 2: rest of flatwater (now sprint) and remaining canoeing disciplines: 1936-2007.

1969 births
Canoeists at the 2000 Summer Olympics
French female canoeists
Living people
Olympic canoeists of France
Olympic bronze medalists for France
Olympic medalists in canoeing
Medalists at the 2000 Summer Olympics
Medalists at the ICF Canoe Slalom World Championships
People from Oyonnax
Sportspeople from Ain